William Blount (c.1514-44 or later), was an English Member of Parliament.

He was a Member (MP) of the Parliament of England for (MUch) Wenlock in 1542.He was the brother of Bessie Blount and the uncle and servant of the illegitimate son of Henry VIII, Henry Fitzroy, Duke of Richmond.

References

1514 births
16th-century deaths
English MPs 1542–1544